Gabriel Noah (born 24 August 1986) is a Cameroonian professional footballer.

Career
Noah played for South African club Mpumalanga Black Aces F.C. before joining Belarusian Premier League side FC Dnepr Mogilev in 2008.

See also
Football in Cameroon

References

External links
 
 Profile at playerstransfer

1986 births
Living people
Cameroonian footballers
Cameroonian expatriate footballers
Expatriate footballers in Belarus
Expatriate footballers in Northern Cyprus
FC Dnepr Mogilev players
Association football midfielders